A number of cities in the Indian state of Telangana have been designated for infrastructure improvement under the Indian Government's Smart Cities Mission and AMRUT (Atal Mission for Rejuvenation and Urban Transformation) programmes.

Note: The statistical data represented in this article is based on "smartcitiesprojects", urban renewal projects launched by Prime Minister Narendra Modi in June 2015 to improve urban infrastructure.

Smart cities
Smart Cities Mission is an urban renewal and retrofitting program by the Government of India with a mission to develop 100 cities (the target has been revised to 109 cities) all over the country making them citizen friendly and sustainable.  The Union Ministry of Urban Development is responsible for implementing the mission in collaboration with the state governments of the respective cities. The government has a vision of developing 100 smart cities as satellite towns of larger cities by modernising the existing mid-sized cities.

Currently Telangana state includes two Smart Cities.

AMRUT cities 

AMRUT (Atal Mission for Rejuvenation and Urban Transformation) is a scheme launched by Prime Minister Narendra Modi in June 2015 aiming at adequate robust sewerage networks and water supply for urban transformation. Rajasthan was the first state in the country to submit State Annual Action Plan under AMRUT.

The Telangana state government has submitted a plan to enhance water supply in 12 AMRUT cities in the state during the fiscal year 2015-16.

Smart and AMRUT cities of Telangana

See also 

List of cities in India by area
List of cities in Telangana by area
List of cities in Telangana by population

Notes

References

External links 
Official Website
Smart Cities Challenges
Ministry of Urban Development
Smart Cities: Mission Statement & Guidelines

Cities in Telangana